Janne Mikael Happonen (born 18 June 1984) is a Finnish former ski jumper who competed from 2001 to 2014, representing Puijo Ski Club.

Career
Happonen made his World Cup debut on 23 November 2001 in Kuopio, finishing an impressive eleventh in the individual large hill competition. Five years later he scored his first World Cup win on 5 March 2006, in a team competition in Willingen. This was followed up exactly a month later on 5 March, when Happonen won his first individual competition on the large hill in Lahti. Another individual win was achieved on 19 March at the ski flying hill in Planica. Happonen scored his third individual win on 3 March 2008 in Kuopio.

In 2006, Happonen won a silver medal in the team large hill competition at the 2006 Winter Olympics in Pragelato. He has also won three medals in the Ski Flying World Championships (silver in 2006 and 2008, bronze in 2010).

Happonen was one of five Finns that travelled to Vancouver for the 2010 Winter Olympics. He participated in all three competitions at Whistler Olympic Park, producing good efforts in the normal hill and large hill competitions, although he was disqualified from the latter due to a suit violation.

World Cup

Standings

Wins

External links

1984 births
Living people
People from Kuopio
Finnish male ski jumpers
Olympic silver medalists for Finland
Olympic ski jumpers of Finland
Ski jumpers at the 2006 Winter Olympics
Ski jumpers at the 2010 Winter Olympics
Olympic medalists in ski jumping
Medalists at the 2006 Winter Olympics
Sportspeople from North Savo